Ersilia is a minor genus of minute sea snails, marine gastropod mollusks in the family Eulimidae.

Species
Only two known species exist within this genus:
 Ersilia mediterranea (Monterosato, 1872)
 † Ersilia oligocaenica Lozouet, 1999
 Ersilia stancyki (Warén, 1980)

References

 Warén, A. (1980). Descriptions of new taxa of Eulimidae (Mollusca, Prosobranchia), with notes on some previously described genera. Zoologica Scripta. 9: 283-306
 Lozouet, P., 1999. Nouvelles espèces de gastéropodes (Mollusca: Gastropoda) de l'Oligocène et du Miocène inférieur d'Aquitaine (sud-ouest de la France). Partie 2. Cossmanniana 6(1-2): 1-68

External links
 To World Register of Marine Species
 Monterosato, T. A. di. (1872). Notizie intorno alle conchiglie mediterranee. Michele Amenta, Palermo, 61 pp
 Warén, A. (1984). A generic revision of the family Eulimidae (Gastropoda, Prosobranchia). Journal of Molluscan Studies. suppl 13: 1-96.
page(s): 42

Eulimidae